The 2014–15 Maine Black Bears women's basketball team will represent the University of Maine in the America East Conference.  The Black Bears were led by fourth year head coach Richard Barron and will once again play most of their home games at the Cross Insurance Center with select games being in the Memorial Gym. They finished the season 23–9, 14–2 in America East play to share the America East regular season title with Albany. They advanced to the semifinals of the America East women's tournament where they lost to Hartford. As champs of the American East Conference who failed to win their conference tournament, they received an automatic bid to the Women's National Invitation Tournament where they lost to Villanova in the first round.

Media
All home games and conference road games will stream on either ESPN3 or AmericaEast.tv. Most road games will stream on the opponents website. All games will be broadcast on the radio on WGUY and online on the Maine Portal.

Roster

Schedule

|-
!colspan=12 style="background:#00244D; color:#78B3E0;"| Exhibition

|-
!colspan=12 style="background:#00244D; color:#78B3E0;"| Regular season

|-
!colspan=12 style="background:#78B3E0; color:#00244D;"| 2015 America East tournament

|-
!colspan=12 style="background:#78B3E0; color:#00244D;"| WNIT

See also
 2014–15 Maine Black Bears men's basketball team

References

Maine
Maine Black Bears women's basketball seasons
2015 Women's National Invitation Tournament participants
Maine
Maine